Buddy Baker (1941–2015), American stock car racing driver
Buddy Baker (composer) (1918–2002), American composer
Buddy Baker, real name of DC Comics character Animal Man